Hospital del Henares is a station on Line 7 of the Madrid Metro and the eastern terminus of that line. me refers to the nearby Hospital Universitario del Henares which also opened in February 2008. It is located in fare Zone B1.

References 

Line 7 (Madrid Metro) stations
Railway stations in Spain opened in 2008
Buildings and structures in Coslada